Neojanacus perplexus is a species of small sea snail, a marine gastropod mollusc in the family Hipponicidae, the hoof shells or hoof snails.

References 

 Powell A. W. B., New Zealand Mollusca, William Collins Publishers Ltd, Auckland, New Zealand 1979

External links
 TePapa photo of holotype

Hipponicidae
Gastropods of New Zealand
Gastropods described in 1907